Edge of Eternity is a 1959 crime film starring Cornel Wilde, Victoria Shaw,
and Mickey Shaughnessy.  Directed by Don Siegel, it was shot in CinemaScope  on location in the Grand Canyon.

Plot
A man has parked his car and is looking into the Grand Canyon with binoculars when someone  releases the emergency brake and pushes the vehicle toward him.  He is able to leap out of the way at the last moment, and in a fierce struggle knocks his attacker over the rim to his death. 

The man is then seen wandering, dishevelled  and talking apparent nonsense by Eli, an old prospector who tells a Deputy Sheriff about it. However, Eli has a reputation for telling tall tales, so the deputy ignores him to chase an attractive woman, Janice Kendon, speeding recklessly down the road. On returning to the abandoned mining office he calls home Eli finds the man dead, hanging with his hands bound behind him.

The Deputy and Janice team up to solve the murders. Janice provides a vital clue when she identifies the hanged man's suit jacket as being made by an exclusive New York City tailor. It develops that he is an Eastern executive of an Arizona mining company. Martin correctly assumes the man has made the cross-country trip to investigate possible theft from the company.

Meanwhile, Eli becomes the murderer's next victim, stabbed to death by someone he welcomes into his home as a friend.

Janice's brother Bob is a rich wastrel who spends most of his days at Scotty O'Brien's tavern, the sole local drinking spot. While Martin is at Janice's house, Bob rushes out after a mysterious phone call. A worried Janice follows him, and Martin follows Janice. 

It turns out O’Brien has been illegally extracting gold from a closed mine, and expects Bob to fly him to Las Vegas in a private plane. When Bob discovers the murders, he refuses---and O'Brien kills Bob just as Janice drives up.

O'Brien takes Janice hostage in her car and shoots up Martin's patrol car. O'Brien thinks he is in the clear when he sees no cars following him, but helicopter patrols have kept him in sight.

Martin leaps aboard a cable car that travels over the deepest point in the Grand Canyon.  He and O’Brien end up fighting outside the car. O'Brien falls to his death, and Martin rescues and comforts Janice.

Cast
 Cornel Wilde as Deputy Les Martin
 Victoria Shaw as Janice Kendon
 Mickey Shaughnessy as Scotty O'Brien
 Edgar Buchanan as Sheriff Edwards
 Rian Garrick as Bob Kendon
 Jack Elam as Bill Ward
 Alexander Lockwood as Jim Kendon
 Dabbs Greer as Gas station attendant
 Tom Fadden as Eli
 Wendell Holmes as Sam Houghton
 Bernhard “Barney” Dehl  police officer (uncredited)
Hope Summers as Motel Owner(uncredited)
Guy Way as Charlie Piper(uncredited)

Filming locations

Filming took place in Kingman, Oatman, and Gold Road, Arizona. The climax of the film, involving a fight on a US Guano cable car suspended above the Grand Canyon, was filmed in the aerial tramway to the Bat Cave mine, in the western Grand Canyon of Arizona. US Guano owned and operated the Bat Cave Mine at the time. Guano was considered a good organic fertiliser before the use of modern synthetics. The mine played out in 1960 and was closed. The head house for the cable car and some of the relic equipment as seen in the film have been preserved and may be viewed today, almost as it was in the film.

External links
 
 
 
 
 Edge of Eternity review, with poster and stills

1959 films
1959 crime drama films
1950s mystery films
American crime drama films
American mystery films
Films set in Arizona
Films directed by Don Siegel
Films scored by Daniele Amfitheatrof
Columbia Pictures films
1950s English-language films
1950s American films